Phorcus turbinatus, common name the turbinate monodont, is a species of sea snail, a marine gastropod mollusk in the family Trochidae, the top snails.

Description
The size of the shell varies between 15 mm and 43 mm. The very solid and thick, imperforate shell has a conical shape. It is whitish, tinged with gray, yellowish or greenish, tessellated with numerous spiral series of reddish, purple or chocolate sub-quadrangular blotches. The conoid spire is more or less elevated.  The apex is eroded. The about 6 whorls are slightly convex, with impressed spiral lines between the series of blotches, the last generally descending anteriorly. The base of the shell is eroded in front of the aperture. The aperture is very oblique. The thick, smooth outer lip is beveled to an edge. It is pearly and iridescent within. The columella is flattened on the face, bluntly lobed within, pearly, backed by an opaque white layer.

Distribution
This marine species occurs in the following locations:
 Mediterranean Sea
 Greek Exclusive Economic Zone
 Portuguese Exclusive Economic Zone
 Spanish Exclusive Economic Zone (Spain, Canary Islands)

References

 Lamarck ([J.-B. M.] de), 1815-1822: Histoire naturelle des animaux sans vertèbres; Paris
 Payraudeau B. C., 1826:  Catalogue descriptif et méthodique des Annelides et des Mollusques de l'île de Corse; Paris pp. 218 + 8 pl.
 Jeffreys J. G., 1856: On the marine Testacea of the Piedmontese coast; Annals and Magazine of Natural History (2) 17: 155-188
 Bucquoy E., Dautzenberg P. & Dollfus G., 1882-1886: Les mollusques marins du Roussillon. Tome Ier. Gastropodes.; Paris, J.B. Baillière & fils 570 p., 66 pl.
 Monterosato T. A. (di), 1888-1889: Molluschi del Porto di Palermo. Specie e varietà; Bullettino della Società Malacologica Italiana, Pisa 13 (1888[1889?]): 161-180 14 (1889): 75-81
 Pallary P., 1912: Catalogue des mollusques du littoral méditerranéen de l'Egypte; Mémoires de l'Institut d'Egypte 7: 69-207, pl. 15-18
 Nordsieck F., 1974: Il genere Osilinus Philippi, 1847 nei mari europei ; La Conchiglia 9-10 (67-68): 21-23
 Nordsieck F., 1982: Die europäischen Meeres-Gehäuseschnecken. 2. Auflage.; Gustav Fischer, Stuttgart 539 pp., 38 pl

External links
 To World Register of Marine Species
 

turbinatus
Gastropods described in 1780